Emanuel Jonh Terry (born August 21, 1996) is an American professional basketball player for Pallacanestro Trieste of the Italia Lega Basket Serie A (LBA). He played college basketball at Lincoln Memorial University, where he was a Division II All-American in 2018.

College career
Terry, a 6’9 power forward from Cleveland High School in Cleveland, Alabama, began his career as a reserve at Lincoln Memorial. He had a breakout season as a senior, averaging 16.9 points, 10.3 rebounds and 2.2 blocked shots per game. Terry led the Railsplitters to South Atlantic Conference (SAC) regular season and tournament championships. For the 2017–18 season, he was named the SAC Player of the Year and was the inaugural conference defensive player of the year. On the national level, Terry was named an All-American by the National Association of Basketball Coaches. He also won the Bevo Francis Award as the top small college player in the country.

Professional career

Canton Charge (2018–2019)
After going undrafted in 2018, Terry was signed by the Denver Nuggets for their NBA Summer League team. Following a strong showing there, he was signed by the Nuggets to compete for a roster spot on their training camp roster. On October 8, 2018, Terry was waived by the Nuggets. On October 11, 2018, Terry was signed to the Cleveland Cavaliers to their training camp roster. On October 13, he was waived by the Cavaliers. He was then added to the training camp roster for the Cavaliers’ NBA G League affiliate, the Canton Charge. Terry played 20 games for Canton, averaging 8.1 points and 6.4 rebounds for the team.

Sioux Falls Skyforce / Phoenix Suns / Miami Heat (2019)
On January 5, 2019, Terry was traded to the Sioux Falls Skyforce for guard Malik Newman. Since the trade, Terry improved upon his averages with Sioux Falls, averaging around 15.9 points, 8.1 rebounds, 1.6 assists, and 1.3 blocks per game in the seven games he played for them.

On January 27, 2019, Terry signed a 10-day contract with the Phoenix Suns and made his NBA debut the same day. That night, he recorded 5 points, 3 rebounds, 2 steals, and an assist in 8 minutes of play during a 116–102 loss to the Los Angeles Lakers. He played in one other game with the Suns before the 10-day contract expired on February 7. The next day, he was reacquired by Sioux Falls.

On February 20, 2019, Terry signed a 10-day contract with the Miami Heat. He was re-acquired by the Skyforce afterwards.

Teksüt Bandırma (2019–2020)
On July 29, 2019, Terry signed a one-year contract with Teksüt Bandırma of the Basketball Super League. In 20 games, he averaged 10.8 points, 7.9 rebounds, 1.3 assists, 1.1 steals, and 1.1 blocks per game.

Hapoel Jerusalem (2020)
On March 1, 2020, Terry signed with Hapoel Jerusalem of the Israeli Premier League. In 10 games, he averaged 9.4 points, 6.5 rebounds, and 1.3 assists per game.

Crvena zvezda (2020)
On September 17, 2020, Crvena zvezda announced the signing of Terry on a two year deal. On December 26, they terminated his contract.

Agua Caliente Clippers (2021)
For the 2020–21 season, Terry landed with the Agua Caliente Clippers of the G League, making his debut on February 11, 2021. He averaged 11 points, 10 rebounds, two assists and one block per game.

Stockton Kings / Return to the Phoenix Suns (2021–2022)
In August 2021, Terry joined the Sacramento Kings for the 2021 NBA Summer League. On September 28, 2021, he signed a contract with the Kings. Terry was waived on October 15 and joined the Stockton Kings later that month.

On December 27, 2021, Terry signed a 10-day contract returning with the Phoenix Suns via the COVID-19 hardship waiver. Terry played 3 games with the Suns in that contract, averaging 5 rebounds per game there, before being waived early from it. On January 4, 2022, he was reacquired and activated by Stockton.

Orléans Loiret Basket (2022)
On April 9, 2022, Terry signed with Orléans Loiret Basket of the French Betclic Élite.

Seoul Samsung Thunders (2022–2023)
On August 11, 2022, he has signed with Seoul Samsung Thunders of the Korean Basketball League.

Pallacanestro Trieste (2023–present)
On January 17, 2023, he signed with Pallacanestro Trieste of the Italia Lega Basket Serie A (LBA).

Career statistics

NBA

|-
| style="text-align:left;"| 
| style="text-align:left;"| Phoenix
| 2 || 0 || 10.0 || .667 || — || .500 || 3.0 || .5 || 1.5 || .0 || 4.5
|-
| style="text-align:left;"| 
| style="text-align:left;"| Miami
| 1 || 0 || 3.0 || .000 || — || .500 || 1.0 || 1.0 || .0 || .0 || 1.0
|-
| style="text-align:left;"| 
| style="text-align:left;"| Phoenix
| 3 || 0 || 6.0 || .000 || — || — || 5.0 || .7 || .3 || .0 || .0
|- class="sortbottom"
| style="text-align:center;" colspan="2"| Career
| 6 || 0 || 6.8 || .333 || — || .500 || 3.7 || .7 || .7 || .0 || 1.7

References

External links

Lincoln Memorial Railsplitters bio
RealGM profile

1995 births
Living people
ABA League players
Agua Caliente Clippers players
American expatriate basketball people in France
American expatriate basketball people in Israel
American expatriate basketball people in Serbia
American expatriate basketball people in Turkey
American men's basketball players
Bandırma B.İ.K. players
Basketball players from Alabama
Canton Charge players
Hapoel Jerusalem B.C. players
KK Crvena zvezda players
Lincoln Memorial Railsplitters men's basketball players
Miami Heat players
Orléans Loiret Basket players
Pallacanestro Trieste players
People from Enterprise, Alabama
Phoenix Suns players
Power forwards (basketball)
Sioux Falls Skyforce players
Stockton Kings players
Undrafted National Basketball Association players
United States men's national basketball team players